Greenock and Inverclyde  was a burgh constituency represented in the House of Commons of the Parliament of the United Kingdom from 1997 until 2005, when it was replaced by the Inverclyde constituency. It elected one Member of Parliament (MP) using the first-past-the-post voting system.

Boundaries
The Inverclyde District electoral divisions of Greenock Central East, Greenock South West, and Inverclyde West.

The constituency included all of the council area of Inverclyde except the wards covering Port Glasgow and Kilmacolm, which were in the West Renfrewshire constituency.

The unusual choice of name (since the town of Greenock is in Inverclyde) reflects the fact that the constituency was created from parts of two predecessor constituencies, Greenock and Port Glasgow and Renfrew West and Inverclyde.

Members of Parliament

Election results

Elections of the 2000s

Elections of the 1990s

References 

Historic parliamentary constituencies in Scotland (Westminster)
Constituencies of the Parliament of the United Kingdom established in 1997
Constituencies of the Parliament of the United Kingdom disestablished in 2005
Politics of Inverclyde
Greenock
Gourock